Preprotachykinin-1, (abbreviated PPT-1, PPT-I, or PPT-A), is a precursor protein that in humans is encoded by the TAC1 gene.

Isoforms and derivatives 
The protein has four isoforms—alpha-, beta-, gamma-, and delta-PPT—which can variably undergo post-translational modification to produce neurokinin A (formerly known as substance K) and substance P. Alpha- and delta-PPT can only be modified to substance P, whereas beta- and gamma-PPT can produce both substance P and neurokinin A.

Neurokinin A can also be further modified to produce neuropeptide K (also known as neurokinin K) and neuropeptide gamma.

These hormones are thought to function as neurotransmitters which interact with nerve receptors and smooth muscle cells. They are known to induce behavioral responses and function as vasodilators and secretagogues.  Alternative splicing of exons 4 and/or 6 produces four known products of undetermined significance.

Human basal ganglia 
The nature and distribution of PPT-1 has been studied in the human basal ganglia. The protein is expressed evenly throughout the caudate and putamen, and 80 to 85% of it exists in the beta-PPT isoform. 15-20% of the protein is in the gamma-PPT isoform, while no alpha-PPT was detected at all.

Species comparison 
In humans, beta-PPT is the dominant isoform in the brain, which contrasts with rats (predominantly gamma-PPT) and cows (alpha-PPT).

While both human and rat PPT-1 produce substance P and neurokinin A, humans produce more neuropeptide K, whereas rats produce more neuropeptide gamma. In cow brains, PPT-1 primarily encodes substance P, but not other neurokinin A-derived peptides.

References

Further reading

Neuropeptides
Precursor proteins